Fakolo is a commune in the Cercle of Koutiala in the Sikasso Region of southern Mali. The commune covers an area of 201 square kilometers and includes 6 villages. In the 2009 census it had a population of 13,130. The village of Zansoni, the administrative centre (chef-lieu) of the commune, is 35 km northwest of Koutiala.

References

External links
.

Communes of Sikasso Region